Comics Salón is an international multigenre festival of Japanese culture, manga, anime, comics, games, sci-fi, fantasy and horror. It is held every year in Slovakia and is the largest convention of its kind in the country.

It is the successor of the international festival IstroCon, which focused on sci-fi, fantasy and horror films, and gaming, and which ran from 1999 to 2003.

 Comics Salón 2004 — 23 September 2004 - Pezinok, Slovakia
 Comics Salón 2005 — 14–15 October 2005 - SÚZA building, Bratislava, Slovakia 
 Comics Salón 2006 — 15–17 September 2006 - SÚZA building, Bratislava, Slovakia
 Comics Salón & IstroCON 2007 — 14–16 September 2007 - SÚZA building, Bratislava, Slovakia
 Comics Salón & IstroCON 2008 — September 2008 - Bratislava, Slovakia
 Comics Salón & IstroCON 2009 — September 2009 - Bratislava, Slovakia
 Comics Salón & IstroCON 2010 — September 2010 - Bratislava, Slovakia
 Comics Salón & IstroCON 2011 — September 2011 - Bratislava, Slovakia
 Comics Salón & IstroCON 2012 — September 2012 - Bratislava, Slovakia
 Comics Salón 2013 — September 2013 - Bratislava, Slovakia
 Comics Salón 2014 — September 2014 - Bratislava, Slovakia — 12,000 attendees
 Comics Salón 2015 — 18–20 September 2015 — DK Ružinov, Bratislava, Slovakia
 Comics Salón 2016 — 16–18 September 2016 — DK Ružinov, Bratislava, Slovakia
 Comics Salón 2017 — 24-26 March 2017 — DK Ružinov, Bratislava, Slovakia
 Comics Salón 2018 — 21–23 September 2018 — DK Ružinov, Bratislava, Slovakia
 Comics Salón 2019 — 29-31 March 2019 — DK Ružinov, Bratislava, Slovakia
 Comics Salón 2020 — 27-29 March 2020 — DK Ružinov, Bratislava, Slovakia
 Comics Salón 2021 — 02-04 July 2021 — DK Ružinov, Bratislava, Slovakia
 Comics Salón 2022 — 16-19 June 2022 — DK Ružinov, Bratislava, Slovakia

External links
 

Multigenre conventions
Slovak culture
Japanese culture